TeraText is a non-relational text database. It is used to store and search through large amounts of textual data. It was originally developed at Royal Melbourne Institute of Technology.

TeraText operation utilises a heavy client server model. A basic setup can consist of a Content Server (CS), Administration Interface, Application Server (AS), Security Server (SLS) and a Boot Server (boots).

Individual servers communicate with each other using the standard Z39.50 protocol. Administration is through the HTTP interface.

References

Proprietary database management systems